Pauline Louise Lopez (born 17 August 1996) is a Filipino taekwondo practitioner. She is a two-time gold medalist at the Southeast Asian Games and a bronze medalist at the Asian Games.

Career 

She competed in the women's 46 kg event at the 2010 Asian Games held in Guangzhou, China. She was eliminated in her second match by Dana Haidar of Jordan. The following year, she competed in the women's finweight event at the 2011 World Taekwondo Championships held in Gyeongju, South Korea where she was eliminated in her first match.

In 2013, she competed in the women's bantamweight event at the 2013 World Taekwondo Championships held in Puebla, Mexico. She won her first match against Yeny Contreras of Chile and also her next match against Ivett Gonda of Hungary but she was then eliminated from the competition by Janike Lai of Norway. A month later, she won the gold medal in the girls' 55 kg event at the 2013 Asian Youth Games held in Nanjing, China. In the final she defeated Fariza Aldangorova of Kazakhstan. In the women's 57 kg event at the 2014 Asian Games held in Incheon, South Korea she was eliminated in her first match by Wang Yun of China.

In 2015, she competed in the women's bantamweight event at the World Taekwondo Championships held in Chelyabinsk, Russia where she was eliminated in her second match by Indra Craen of Belgium.

In 2016, she failed to qualify for the 2016 Summer Olympics after losing her match against Phannapa Harnsujin of Thailand at the 2016 Asian Taekwondo Olympic Qualification Tournament held at the Marriot Convention Center Grand Ballroom in Pasay, Metro Manila, Philippines. A few days later, she did win the gold medal in the women's 57 kg event at the 2016 Asian Taekwondo Championships held in the same location.

She won one of the bronze medals in the women's 57 kg event at the 2018 Asian Games held in Jakarta, Indonesia. In 2019, she won the gold medal in the women's 57 kg event at the Southeast Asian Games held in the Philippines.

In 2021, she competed at the Asian Olympic Qualification Tournament held in Amman, Jordan hoping to qualify for the 2020 Summer Olympics in Tokyo, Japan. She won her first match and she was then eliminated in her second match by Laetitia Aoun of Lebanon.

References

External links 
 

Living people
1996 births
Place of birth missing (living people)
Filipino female taekwondo practitioners
Taekwondo practitioners at the 2010 Asian Games
Taekwondo practitioners at the 2014 Asian Games
Taekwondo practitioners at the 2018 Asian Games
Medalists at the 2018 Asian Games
Asian Games bronze medalists for the Philippines
Asian Games medalists in taekwondo
Southeast Asian Games gold medalists for the Philippines
Southeast Asian Games bronze medalists for the Philippines
Southeast Asian Games medalists in taekwondo
Competitors at the 2013 Southeast Asian Games
Competitors at the 2015 Southeast Asian Games
Competitors at the 2017 Southeast Asian Games
Competitors at the 2019 Southeast Asian Games
Asian Taekwondo Championships medalists
21st-century Filipino women